Scott Schultz (born April 19, 1978) is a former Canadian football defensive tackle for the Saskatchewan Roughriders of the Canadian Football League. He played college football at North Dakota.

Schultz has also been a member of the San Diego Chargers and Pittsburgh Steelers.

He retired on August 4, 2009, to become the president of an insurance brokerage.

References

External links
Saskatchewan Roughriders bio

1978 births
Living people
American football defensive linemen
Canadian football defensive linemen
Canadian players of American football
North Dakota Fighting Hawks football players
Sportspeople from Moose Jaw
Pittsburgh Steelers players
Players of Canadian football from Saskatchewan
San Diego Chargers players
Saskatchewan Roughriders players